The Market–Frankford Line (MFL) (also called the Market–Frankford Subway–Elevated Line (MFSE), the Market–Frankford El (MFE), the El, or the Blue Line) is one of three rapid transit lines in Philadelphia, Pennsylvania; it and the Broad Street Line are operated by SEPTA, and the PATCO Speedline is operated by PATCO. The Market–Frankford Line runs from the 69th Street Transportation Center in Upper Darby, just outside of West Philadelphia, through Center City Philadelphia to the Frankford Transportation Center in Near Northeast Philadelphia. With more than 170,000 boardings on an average weekday, it is the busiest route in the SEPTA system. The line has both elevated and underground portions along its full length.

Route
The Market–Frankford Line begins at 69th Street Transportation Center in Upper Darby. The MFL heads east at ground level and passes north of the borough of Millbourne. From there, it enters West Philadelphia and is elevated over Market Street until 46th Street, where it curves north and east and then descends underground via a portal at 44th Street. At 42nd Street, the tunnel returns to the alignment of Market Street.

At 32nd Street, the tunnel carrying the SEPTA subway–surface trolley lines joins the MFL tunnel. The MFL tracks are in the center and the trolley tracks are on the outside. 30th Street consists of an island platform between the two innermost tracks for Market–Frankford Line trains, and outboard "wall" platforms for subway–surface route 10, 11, 13, 34, and 36 trolleys. After passing beneath the Schuylkill River, the next stop to the east for Market–Frankford Line trains is at 15th Street; subway–surface trolleys also have stations at 22nd Street and 19th Street. 15th Street is the central interchange station for the MFL, subway–surface trolleys, and Broad Street Line. The subway–surface trolley tracks end in a loop beneath Juniper Street at Market just after crossing above the Broad Street Line.

Though it now tunnels in a straight line directly beneath Philadelphia City Hall, prior to 1936, the original MFL trackage between 15th and 13th Street stations separated and looped around the foundation of City Hall (eastbound trains passed around the south side and westbound trains passed around the north side). Parts of that original alignment are now used by subway–surface cars as they pass south of City Hall en route to 13th Street station (as well as the bridgework in the ceiling of the southbound platform of the City Hall stop on the Broad Street line). The Market Street tunnel continues east to Front Street and then turns north, where it rises in the median of I-95. The line then heads under the southbound lanes and over Front Street for about a mile on an elevated structure. Just north of Pratt Street, a curve to the north brings the line to its terminus at the Frankford Transportation Center, which replaced the original Bridge & Pratt Streets terminal.

History

Original subway and expansion
The original subway tunnel from City Hall to the portal at 23rd Street, as well as the bridge to carry the line across the Schuylkill River, just north of Market Street, were built from April 1903 to August 1905. Construction on the Market Street Elevated west from this point began In April 1904, and the line opened on March 4, 1907, from 69th Street Terminal to a loop around City Hall at 15th Street. The line was elevated west of the river and underground east of the river. The tunnel was also used by streetcar lines, now SEPTA's subway–surface lines, that entered the line just east of the river and turned around at the City Hall loop. Philadelphia was unusual in that the construction of its initial downtown subway was undertaken using PRT (Philadelphia Rapid Transit Co.) private capital only, with no contribution from public funds.

Extensions took the subway east to 2nd Street on August 3, 1908, and via a portal at 2nd street and several elevated curves it reached the Delaware River between Market Street and Chestnut Street on September 7, 1908. The Delaware Avenue Elevated (also called the Ferry Line, because of the multiple ferries across the river) opened on October 4, 1908, as a further extension south along the river to South Street. The only two stations on this extension were Market–Chestnut and South Street.

The "first operating section" of the Frankford Elevated was planned to extend from Arch Street (connection with PTC Market Street line) to Bridge Street, . Construction, financed by the City of Philadelphia and managed by the Department of City Transit, was started in September 1915. At that time, construction was anticipated to require about three years. However, construction was slowed because of World War I. By February 1920, 65 percent of the construction work had been completed and 15 percent was under contract. Of the remainder, plans had been completed for ten percent, leaving approximately ten percent of construction "yet to be arranged for". The superstructure had been completed between Dyre Street (south of Pratt Street) to a point just north of Arch Street. However, only two stations had been completed, and six had not been started. Signals, substations and cars had "yet to be arranged for". In 1919, the Public Service Commission of Pennsylvania approved a connection between the Frankford and Market Street lines in 1919, with signals and signal tower to be built by PRT. But the Philadelphia City Solicitor determined that the connection could not be built until a contract for operation had been signed and approved by the PSC. This did not take place until 1922. The line was dedicated on November 4, 1922, and opened for service on November 5. Trains from 69th Street alternated between the Frankford and Ferry Line terminals.

Total expenditures by the city for the Frankford El "with its track, substations, equipment and certain rolling stock" was $15,604,000 to December 31, 1929.

The planned – and authorized – second section of the Frankford El, Bridge Street to Rhawn Street with intermediate stations at Comly Street, Levick Street, Tyson Avenue, and Cottman Avenue, 3.0 mi (4.8 km) was not built.

Following the opening of the Delaware River Bridge in 1926, traffic on the Delaware Ave branch declined sharply. Evening, Sunday and holiday service was discontinued on January 24, 1937. Sunday and holiday service was restored from May 30 to September 13, 1937, and again from July 3 to September 12, 1938. The last day of service was May 6, 1939, with the last train departing South Street at 7:00 p.m. Thereafter, the line was closed and dismantled. A replacement bus service was started in 1943 to serve wartime traffic, and continued in operation until 1953. The old interlocking tower and stub remains of the junction with the Ferry Line survived until the realignment into the median of I-95 in 1977.

As part of a program of railroad improvements undertaken by the City of Philadelphia and the Pennsylvania Railroad, a new section of tunnel from 22nd Street to 46th Street was started in 1930, which would allow for removal of the elevated structure east of 46th Street and the old Schuylkill River Bridge. Coinciding with this project, a new bridge was also to be built across the river for automobile traffic; this raised the level of the street to permit the roadway to pass over the underground tracks of the Pennsylvania Railroad near their new 30th Street Station. Funding ran out before the subway extension could be finished. Although streetcar tracks were installed in the new Market Street Bridge, there was insufficient clearance to pass any cars under the elevated, and no service would ever be provided over the new tracks. Subway construction resumed in 1947, and the current configuration opened on November 6, 1955. The old elevated structure was removed by June 20, 1956. While the track was redirected into the new subway, a short stub of the old elevated structure remained at 45th Street until the reconstruction of the Market Street Elevated in 2008.

In addition to extending the Market Street subway tunnel west to 46th Street, with new stations at 30th, 34th and 40th streets, a new trolley tunnel was built under Market, Ludlow and 36th streets and the former Woodland Avenue, leading to a new western portal at 40th Street for routes 11, 13, 34 and 36 (route 10 trolleys use a separate portal at 36th and Ludlow). New stations for the trolleys were constructed at 22nd, 30th, 33rd (between Market and Ludlow), 36th (at Sansom), and 37th (at Spruce) streets. The 24th Street trolley station and tunnel portal was abandoned. The tunnel mouth was visible from Market Street until the Philadelphia Electric Company (now PECO) built the PECO Building on the site in 1969.

Skip-stop operation began on January 30, 1956. In the original skip-stop configuration, in addition to the A and B stops shown on the map above, 2nd and 34th Street were "A" stations, and Fairmount (replaced by Spring Garden) was a "B" station; the A and B designations at these stations were changed to "All-Stop" because of increased patronage in the 1990s. As I-95 was built through Center City Philadelphia in the late 1970s, part of the Frankford El was relocated to I-95's median, and the Fairmount station was replaced by Spring Garden, on May 16, 1977. Skip-stop operation, which was only available during rush hours on weekdays, was discontinued on February 21, 2020.

Reconstruction

Between 1988 and 2003, SEPTA undertook a $493.3 million complete reconstruction of the Frankford side of the Market–Frankford Line between Frankford Transportation Center and the 2nd Street portal. The new Frankford Elevated was built with new stringers and deck installed on the original columns, thus giving not only a reduction in cost, but also reducing the street-level impact on adjoining neighborhoods. The old ballasted trackage was replaced with a direct fixation system. In addition to the new Elevated structure, all of the stations were replaced with new stations with higher boarding platforms and elevators, allowing customers with disabilities to easily board and depart from Market-Frankford trains. The reconstruction of the Frankford Elevated structure was mostly complete by 2000, with the exception of the elevated section from Dyre Street (just to the south of the Bridge-Pratt terminal) to the Frankford Yard entrance. The basic design of the bearings of the reconstructed Frankford elevated, however, was not appropriate for the repetitive loading from the train traffic. The bearing design did not take into consideration the interaction of the concrete haunches with the steel stringers when loaded by the passing train; and the concrete has started to fracture and drop onto the street below. The problem was first discovered in 1997, but at that time was simply attributed to faulty construction, without evaluation of the root cause. As a temporary fix, SEPTA has installed 10,000 metal mesh belts on the underside of the structure. Estimates for a permanent fix placed the cost at about $20 million, and SEPTA has filed suit against the engineering companies that contributed to the design flaw to recover part of the repair cost. Work on the permanent fix is currently underway.

SEPTA then undertook a $567 million complete reconstruction of the Market Street Elevated between 69th Street Transportation Center and the 44th Street portal between 1999 and 2009. The New Market Street Elevated was an entirely new structure, utilizing single-pillar supports in place of the old-style dual pillar design, allowing the Pennsylvania Department of Transportation (PennDOT) to undertake a planned widening project on Market Street to four lanes between 63rd Street and 44th Street. In addition to the new Elevated structure, all of the stations (including Millbourne) were again replaced with new stations having higher boarding platforms and elevators, allowing customers with disabilities to easily board and depart from trains. The reconstruction of the Market St. Elevated superstructure was completed in 2008, and the last station, 63rd Street, was completed and reopened on May 4, 2009. The Market St. Elevated is not of the same design as the Frankford Elevated, so it does not share any of the Frankford design flaws.

In 2003, the Bridge-Pratt terminal was closed and replaced with the new Frankford Transportation Center. After Bridge-Pratt closed, the station platforms and the remaining unrebuilt elevated structure above Frankford Avenue and Bridge Street were demolished. The new $160 million Frankford terminal facility was built on a tract of land off Frankford Avenue formerly part of the adjacent bus and trackless trolley service depot.

In November 2011, the Federal Transit Administration (FTA), through its competitive Fiscal Year 2011 Sustainability Initiative, awarded $1.4 million to SEPTA to install a "wayside energy storage system" on the Market–Frankford Line. The system stores energy from braking trains in a battery that may be used later.

Extension proposal
An extension of the Market–Frankford Line from Frankford to Roosevelt Boulevard and Bustleton Avenue had been proposed in 2011, but no plans or extension construction has taken place.

Proposed infill station
In the City of Philadelphia's 2021 Transit Plan, one proposal in their list of possible high-capacity transit expansion plans was an infill station located between the MFL's 15th Street and 30th Street stations. The 15-block area between the two stations was cited as being a major part of Philadelphia's CBD since the 1960's. The plan stated that an infill station on the Market-Frankford Line in this part of the city would not only provide better access for major developments, but it would also create transfer opportunities with frequent north-south bus routes on 19th and 20th Streets. However, the 2021 Transit Plan said that while initial studies showed such a station would be feasible and highly beneficial, it would very difficult and expensive to build.

Recent developments

All stations except 5th Street were reopened in June 2020.

In 2021, SEPTA proposed rebranding their rail transit service as "SEPTA Metro", in order to make the system easier to navigate. Under this proposal, services along the Market–Frankford Line will be rebranded as the "L" line with a blue color.

Operation

As with many other rail lines, the signal system on the Market–Frankford Line has progressed from the original lineside block signals using semaphores, to three-aspect Type D color light (green, over yellow, over red) signals, to cab signalling, eliminating the lineside block signals except at interlockings.

The Market-Frankford line is unusual as subway–elevated systems go. As such, any possible future physical connection to other rapid-transit lines in Philadelphia is limited to cross-platform transfer only, as both the Broad Street subway and the Norristown High-Speed Line are standard gauge with top-contact third rail. The Market–Frankford Line and Metro-North Railroad are the only railroads in North America that use bottom-contact third rail, known as the Wilgus-Sprague system. Its advantages include a reduced risk of electrocution for track workers and fewer disruptions due to icing conditions during winter weather.

The Market–Frankford Elevated's original construction also had some marked differences from that of other US elevated systems (such as Chicago or New York City). While those systems' elevated lines were built with rails laid on ties (sleepers) that were bolted directly to large steel girders, the Market-Frankford's structure consisted of steel girders supporting a concrete trough deck, which then supported the more conventional railroad construction of rails laid on floating ties with loose rock ballast. This was done in an attempt to reduce noise and vibration, as well as protect the streets below from rain and "operational fluids."

Prior to February 2020, during rush hours SEPTA operated trains in a skip-stop pattern. Stations were designated as "A" stations, "B" stations, or "All Trains" stations; trains designated as "A" trains skipped "B" stops and vice versa. Skip-stop service ended on February 21, 2020, and was replaced by expanded all-stations service three days later.

The base fare for riding the line is $2.00 using the Travel Wallet on a SEPTA Key card and $2.50 using a Quick Trip. Payment of base fare includes free transfer to the subway–surface lines at 30th, 15th, and 13th Street stations, as well as to the Broad Street Line at 15th street. While the Broad-Ridge Spur connects at 8th St. Station, there is no longer a free-transfer passageway between the lines. Transfers are available with a SEPTA Key card; the first transfer is free while the second transfer costs $1.00.

SEPTA's "TransPass" and "TrailPass" weekly/monthly zone-based passcards loaded on a SEPTA Key card are also accepted as fares. 

In FY 2005, 25,220,523 passengers rode the Market–Frankford Line. Weekday average ridership of 178,715 made it the busiest line in the entire SEPTA system. The Market–Frankford Line required 142 vehicles at peak hours, cost $86,644,614 in fully allocated expenses, and collected $54,309,344 in passenger revenues, for an impressive farebox recovery ratio of 63 percent.

On February 11, 2008, SEPTA expanded morning and afternoon weekday service with off-peak trains running every six minutes instead of eight. This represents a 12% increase in MFL Service throughout the day.

Operating times and headways
A local trip along the entire line takes about 40 minutes. Trains run from approximately 5:00 am to 1:00 am, with a timed-transfer at 12:30 am at City Hall station to connect with the Broad Street Line based on final trains. The Market-Frankford Owl bus service replaces the subway throughout the night Monday through Friday mornings, stopping at the same locations as the subway trains. The line itself ran 24 hours a day until it was eliminated in 1991; it was reinstated on June 20, 2014, for Friday and Saturday overnights only on a trial basis. It was made permanent on October 8, 2014. Since 2014, the line runs nonstop from 5:00 a.m. on Friday to 1:00 a.m. on Monday morning.

The Market–Frankford Line carries a daytime frequency of six minutes on weekdays (off peak), and ten minutes on weekends. It runs every 12 minutes during night service, with a 20-minute headway during weekend night owl service, and 15 minutes on the night owl bus service Monday through Friday mornings (late Sunday through Thursday nights).

Rolling stock
The original cars for the Market Street subway, numbered 1–135 and later designated as Class A-8 by SEPTA's predecessor, the Philadelphia Transportation Company (PTC), were built by the Pressed Steel Car Co. of Pittsburgh, Pa., between 1906 and 1911. An additional set of cars, numbered 136–215, were built by the J.G. Brill Co. of Philadelphia, Pa., between 1911 and 1913. The Frankford Elevated portion opened in 1922 along with another set of cars, numbered 501–600, also built by Brill that year, later receiving the designation Class A-15. The two rail lines were soon merged, resulting in a combined fleet of 315 cars (215 Market Street cars, 100 Frankford cars). By 1960, when the PTC began replacing the cars, the Market Street cars had been in operation for 56 years, thus having the longest lifespan of any Philadelphia subway cars, surpassing that of the original Broad Street subway fleet, which had 54 years of operation. The Frankford cars phased out at 38 years of operation. After retirement, two of the "Market" cars (cars 69 and 163) and six of the "Frankford" cars - cars 532, 551, 559, 583, 585, and 589 - were retained as work train cars for some time. It is currently unknown when these cars were withdrawn, but all had been removed from SEPTA property by the 1970s, with none reported to have been saved for museums.

The "Market" and "Frankford" cars were replaced by a fleet of 270 new stainless steel cars built in 1960 by the Budd Company. The PTC had designated Class A-49 cars numbered 601–646 as Class A-49, and numbers 701–924 as A-50 and A-51. All cars were re-designated as Class M-3 when SEPTA assumed operation of the line. The cars had been nicknamed "Almond Joys" by many riders as their distinctive ventilation fan housings resembled the almonds atop the Peter Paul (now Hershey's) Almond Joy bar. These cars, while mostly an improvement in quality compared to their predecessors, had been plagued with faulty wheel frame assemblies, causing the body to shake, sometimes violently, as the car moved. The cars' fan housings had provisions for air conditioning units, however, only one car, number 614, had ever been air conditioned, which the transit authority had found to be uneconomical at the time.

Early in their service lives, some M-3 cars had fareboxes by their center side doors; these were necessary for collecting fares during the hours after midnight, when SEPTA closed cashier's booths at many stations during the era of 24-hour rapid transit service. "Night Owl" service (midnight–5:00 AM) trains operated on a twenty-minute headway (interval between trains) at that time. SEPTA now operates (along with the Broad Street subway) all "Owl" service using buses, but similar to the old "Owl" trains, they run between 69th Street and Frankford Transportation Center on a slightly more frequent 15-minute interval.

During the late 1980s and early 1990s, some M-3s were regauged to work on the Norristown High Speed Line during the delivery of the N-5 cars.

In the early 1990s, the Market–Frankford Line was in need of new rolling stock. The M-3 cars were approaching the end of their expected useful lifespan, as well as being increasingly scrutinized for their shaky ride quality and lack of air conditioning. SEPTA placed an order for 220 new rail cars, each costing $1.29 million.

These cars, designated Class M-4, were manufactured by Adtranz (now Bombardier Transportation) in Elmira, New York, and delivered between 1997 and 1999. These cars are equipped with AC traction motors, air conditioning, LCD signage, and automated announcements. All of the M-3 cars were retired after the last of the M-4's entered service, with five of the former being converted to work cars. The five remaining M-3's were later retired, with M-4 cars 1033 and 1034 replacing them for work service, and the last of the remaining M-3's had been scrapped by 2005. Two of the M-3's have been preserved, cars 606 and 618 at the Pennsylvania Trolley Museum and the Seashore Trolley Museum, respectively. These cars represent the only preserved examples of Market-Frankford line rolling stock.

In February 2017, SEPTA temporarily removed about 90 M-4 cars from service after inspections revealed cracks and signs of fatigue in load-bearing bolsters and associated components.

SEPTA has begun the process to obtain a new M-5 fleet to replace the very problematic M-4 cars.

Accidents 

On December 26, 1961, one man died and 38 others were injured when four cars of a train derailed while rounding the curve just north of York-Dauphin Station. The deceased was identified as Earl Giberson, a 64-year-old man.

On March 7, 1990, four people died and another 162 injured when the rear three cars of six-car train #61 derailed after leaving 30th Street Station westbound at 8:20 a.m. It is believed that one of the traction motors dropped out of the rear truck on the third car (M3) somewhere between 15th and 30th street stations, and it became entangled in a switch immediately upon leaving 30th street station. The front truck of the fourth car (M3 #818) followed the third car, while the rear truck of the fourth car took the diverging track, causing the car to shear halfway upon striking the steel pillars separating the tracks beyond the switch.

On February 21, 2017, a train derailed at the 69th Street Station loop after it crashed into a stopped train and caused a third train on an adjacent track to derail, seriously injuring one of the operators and injuring three others.

Stations
All connections, unless otherwise noted, are operated by SEPTA.

References

Further reading

External links

Market-Frankford Line on SEPTA website

NYCsubway.org – SEPTA Market–Frankford Line
Stan's Railpix – Septa Photo Gallery Page 3* SEPTA Market–Frankford Line Pictures
West Philadelphia Collaborative History – The Market Street Elevated ("The El")

 
Railway lines opened in 1907
Underground rapid transit in the United States
5 ft 2¼ in gauge railways in the United States
Historic American Engineering Record in Philadelphia
600 V DC railway electrification
700 V DC railway electrification
1907 establishments in Pennsylvania
Railway lines in highway medians